The Silver Car is a lost 1921 silent film crime film directed by David Smith starring Earle Williams and Kathryn Adams. It was produced and distributed by the Vitagraph Company.

Cast
Earle Williams - Anthony Trent
Kathryn Adams - Daphne Grenvil
Geoffrey Webb - Arthur Grenvil
Eric Mayne - Count Michael Temesvar
Emmett King - Earl of Rosecarrel
Mona Lisa - Pauline
John Steppling - Vicar
Max Asher - Hentzi
Walter Rodgers - Colonel Langley

References

External links

 The Silver Car at IMDb.com 

 lantern slide (State University of New York; SUNY)

1921 films
Vitagraph Studios films
American silent feature films
Lost American films
American black-and-white films
Films directed by David Smith (director)
American crime films
1921 crime films
1921 lost films
1920s American films